The 1989 Ice Hockey World Championships took place in Sweden from 15 April – 1 May. The games were played in Södertälje and Stockholm, in the newly built arena Globen. Eight teams took part, and each team played each other once. The four best teams then played each other again. This was the 53rd World Championships, and also the 64th European Championships. The Soviet Union became world champions for the 21st time, and also European champions for the 26th time.

The tournament was marred by positive drug tests.  Only the goal totals of the Americans were affected in the end.  Their losses against the Czechoslovaks and the Canadians were ruled as shutouts because of Corey Millen's high testosterone levels.  Canadian Randy Carlyle also came under suspicion, but his A and B samples did not match, and he was cleared of wrongdoing. The Soviet team won all ten of their games.

At the end of the tournament, Soviet star Alexander Mogilny defected to the United States by getting on a plane with two Buffalo Sabres executives. The Sabres had drafted Mogilny the year before. He joined the team and went on to score 1032 points in his NHL career.

World Championship Group A (Sweden)

First round

Final Round

Consolation round

Poland was relegated to Group B.

World Championship Group B (Norway)
Played in Oslo and Lillehammer 30 March to 9 April.  The 5 April game between Norway and Austria was officially adjusted to 8-0 for Norway because of Siegfried Haberl's positive drug test. Standard procedure, since 1969, had been for Group B and Group C to exchange two teams, but that stopped this year.

Norway was promoted to Group A and Denmark was relegated to Group C.

World Championship Group C (Australia)
Played in Sydney 18–27 March.

The Netherlands were promoted to Group B, and Australia was relegated to Group D.

World Championship Group D (Belgium)
Played in Geel and Heist-op-den-Berg 16–21 March.

Positive drug tests wiped out the results of the first day: both games were officially rendered scoreless, and were counted as losses for all four teams.

Both Belgium and Romania were promoted to Group C.

Ranking and statistics

Tournament Awards
Best players selected by the directorate:
Best Goaltender:       Dominik Hašek
Best Defenceman:       Viacheslav Fetisov
Best Forward:          Brian Bellows
Media All-Star Team:
Goaltender:  Dominik Hašek
Defence:  Anders Eldebrink,  Viacheslav Fetisov
Forwards:  Vyacheslav Bykov,  Sergei Makarov,  Steve Yzerman

Final standings
The final standings of the tournament according to IIHF:

European championships final standings
The final standings of the European Championship were determined by the points earned in games played solely between European teams.

Scoring leaders
List shows the top skaters sorted by points, then goals.
Source:

Leading goaltenders
Only the top five goaltenders, based on save percentage, who have played 50% of their team's minutes are included in this list.
Source:

Citations

References
Complete results

IIHF Men's World Ice Hockey Championships
World
1989
April 1989 sports events in Europe
May 1989 sports events in Europe
Sports competitions in Södertälje
International sports competitions in Stockholm
1980s in Stockholm
1988–89 in Norwegian ice hockey
1988–89 in Belgian ice hockey
1989 in Australian ice hockey
March 1989 sports events in Europe
1980s in Sydney
Sports competitions in Sydney
International sports competitions in Oslo
1980s in Oslo
Sport in Lillehammer
Sport in Geel
Sport in Heist-op-den-Berg